Midshipman 1st Class Sydney Barber is the first African American woman to serve as Brigade Commander at the United States Naval Academy.

Biography 
Barber is from Lake Forest, Illinois and attended Lake Forest High School.

She is a mechanical engineering major at the United States Naval Academy and a member of the Academy's track team. Her father also attended the Naval Academy and graduated in 1991.

In 2020, Barber was chosen to serve as the spring 2021 Naval Academy's Brigade Commander making her the first African American woman to be selected for this role.

References 

United States Naval Academy alumni
People from Lake Forest, Illinois
Living people
Year of birth missing (living people)
Military personnel from Illinois